Satin is a type of woven material with a glossy surface.

Satin may also refer to:
Satin stitch
Satin finish, a type of surface finishing
Satin, Texas
Josh Satin (born 1984), American Major League Baseball player
Dennis Satin (born 1968), German film director and screenwriter 
Mark Satin (born 1946), American political theorist
4 Satin, a 1997 EP by Mogwai
Satin, a character in the DreamWorks Animation film Trolls

See also
 Sateen
 Satan
 Don Satijn (born 1953), Dutch musician and artist